Felix Kwakye Ofosu is a Ghanaian politician and former Deputy Information Minister under the National Democratic Congress (NDC) in the John Dramani Mahama Administration   and currently the aspiring MP for Abura Asebu Kwamankese.

References

Government ministers of Ghana
Year of birth missing (living people)
21st-century Ghanaian politicians
National Democratic Congress (Ghana) politicians